Annacleta Mathapelo Siwisa is a South African politician serving as a Member of Parliament for the Economic Freedom Fighters. She was elected to parliament in 2019.

In parliament, Siwisa serves as a member of the Portfolio Committee on Public Works and Infrastructure.

References

External links

Ms Annacleta Mathapelo Siwisa at Parliament of South Africa

Living people
Year of birth missing (living people)
Place of birth missing (living people)
Economic Freedom Fighters politicians
Members of the National Assembly of South Africa
Women members of the National Assembly of South Africa